Handan Iron and Steel Group or Hansteel is a state-owned iron and steel enterprise engaging in the manufacturing, processing, and sale of black metal, billet, steel rolling, carbamide, sintering mineral, metallurgical machinery parts, and coke. It was established in 1958 and it is headquartered in Handan, Hebei, China.

Its subsidiary company, Handan Iron and Steel Company Limited, was established in 1996 and was listed on the Shanghai Stock Exchange in 1998.

In 2008, Hansteel merged with Tangsteel Group of Tangshan, Hebei, to become Hebei Iron and Steel Group, which is the fifth largest steel producer in the world. Their listed subsidiaries were also merged to form Hebei Iron and Steel Company.

References

External links
Handan Iron and Steel Group Company Limited

Manufacturing companies established in 1958
Steel companies of China
Companies based in Hebei
Companies owned by the provincial government of China
1958 establishments in China
Handan